Pavol Habera (born Pavel Habera, 12 April 1962, in Brezno, Czechoslovakia), better known as Paľo Habera, is a Slovak singer, musician, composer, and musical actor. He gained popularity in the 1980s as the leader of the rock band TEAM and has since been known through his successful solo career, and most recently as a judge on the television shows SuperStar Search Slovakia and SuperStar, based on the British music competition television series Pop Idol.

Biography

Career
Habera studied economics at school, but eventually found his specialization in music. Before performing compulsory military service, he sang in the band Tristo hrmených – 300 HR, which also included Andrej Šeban, and later in Burčiak, also with Šeban. After returning from the army, Habera played with the band Avion. In 1988, he joined TEAM, a pop rock band from the city of Martin, whose fame rose with the arrival of their new lead singer. He has remained the group's frontman to this day.

In 1991, Habera won the Zlatý slavík and Anděl music awards. The following year, he launched a successful solo career.

Habera was a judge on the panel of the Slovak music competition television show SuperStar Search Slovakia, modelled on the British program Pop Idol. Since 2009, he has been a judge on the show SuperStar, a Czech-Slovak co-production of the same format.

Habera has also written music for other artists, including Karel Gott, for whom he wrote the 1992 hit "Když muž se ženou snídá" and the 1993 single "Svet lásku má", which he sang together with Gott and opera singer Peter Dvorský.

In addition to his musical activities, Habera has also dabbled in acting. He played the lead role in the 1993 musical film Fontána pre Zuzanu 2, which also starred Malian-Slovak singer and actor Ibrahim Maiga and famous Czech singer Lucie Bílá.

Personal life
Habera lived in the United States for four years and now lives in Prague. He is married to Czech model Daniela Peštová, with whom he has a daughter, Ela, and a son, Paul. He also has a daughter, Zuzana, from a previous marriage.

Discography

with TEAM

 Team 1 (1988)
 Ora Team (also Team en Esperanto) (1989)
 Team 2 - Prichytený pri živote (1989)
 Team 3 (1990)
 Team 4 (1991)
 Team 5 (1993)
 Team 6 - Voľná zóna (1996)
 Team 7 - 7edem (2000)
 Team 8 - Mám na teba chuť :-) (2002)
 Team X (2004)
 Team 11 (2007)

Solo
Studio albums
 Pavol Habera (1991)
 Habera 2 (1992)
 Zhasni a svieť (1995
 Svet lásku má with Peter Dvorský, Karel Gott, and the Slovak Philharmonic, conducted by Ondrej Lenárd (1996)
 Habera '97 (1997)
 Vianočné koncerty with Peter Dvorský (1998)
 Vianočná hviezda with Peter Dvorský (1999)
 Boli sme raz milovaní (2000)
 To sa stáva (2006)

Soundtrack albums
 Fontána pre Zuzanu 2 (1993)

Compilations
 Pavol Habera výber (1995)
 Zlaté Hity (2001)

Singles
 "Chcem to zažiť eště raz" (featuring Ben Cristovao and Viktor Hazard) (2019)
 "Láska a smrť" (2020)

Others
 Stala Sa Nám Láska... with Burčiak (1989)

References

External links
 TEAM official website
 Pavol Habera fanpage
 

Living people
1962 births
People from Brezno
20th-century Slovak male singers
Slovak guitarists
SuperStar Search Slovakia
SuperStar (Czech and Slovak TV series)
Male musical theatre actors
Slovak actors
Esperanto-language singers
21st-century Slovak male singers
Czechoslovak male singers